The Representative Regiment of the Polish Armed Forces is an Honor Guard unit of the Polish Armed Forces, of regimental size. It performs public duties for the armed forces and the President of Poland throughout the Warsaw Capital Garrison region and acts as the main drill and ceremony unit for the military. It performs during the annual Armed Forces Day parade on Ujazdów Avenue, during state arrival ceremonies at the Presidential Palace and alongside other honor units at the National Independence Day ceremony. The regiment has been described by President Andrzej Duda as one of "the best-drilled and organised formations in the world".

History 

The first honor guard unit of independent Poland was formed in 1954. In 1969, it was divided into the Representative Honor Guard Company of the Polish People's Army and the newly created State Honors Company. The first company represented the armed forces during state ceremonies while the second company was supposed to guard the Tomb of the Unknown Soldier, and other memorial sites in Poland. In 1982 the use of the Polish Rogatywka was restored to the soldiers of the guard of honor. The company was dissolved in 1990 following the fall of communism in the Polish People's Republic. The company was restored on January 1, 1993 with direct subordination to the Commander of the Warsaw Garrison. It eventually became the 1st Honor Guard Company of the Representative Honor Guard Battalion of the Armed Forces in 2001, acting as an independent joint-service formation with personnel from service branches of the armed forces. On 31 March 2018, the battalion became the 1st Guards Battalion, Representative Honor Guard Regiment of the Armed Forces, following yet another Armed Forces-wide reorganization of its ceremonial units. The regiment received its colors a year later at the Tomb of the Unknown Soldier in Warsaw by President Andrzej Duda.

Composition 
Command and headquarters
1st Representative Company of the Polish Armed Forces
2nd Representative Company of the Polish Armed Forces
3rd Representative Company of the Polish Armed Forces
Salute Platoon
Representative Band of the Polish Armed Forces
1st Band
2nd Band
Cavalry Squadron of the Polish Armed Forces

The personnel that make up this battalion come from the represents the three main service branches of the Armed Forces (Polish Army, Navy and Air Force). Until recently, the Polish Special Forces were also represented in the regiment at all state functions and were even present with the entire battalion on Red Square during the 2010 Moscow Victory Day Parade.

List of commanders 
 Lt. Col. Adam Wronecki (January 1, 2001 - May 16, 2002)
 Lt. Col. Roman Januszewski (May 17, 2002  - November 19, 2006)
 Lt. Col. Tomasz Dominikowski (November 20, 2006 - January 31, 2010)
 Lt. Col. Wojciech Erbel (February 1, 2010 - December 31, 2013)
 Col. Leszek Szczesniak (January 1, 2014 – November 18, 2016, March 31, 2018-present)
 Lt. Col. Włodzimierz Grochowiec (November 19, 2016 – December 5, 2016)
 Lt. Col. Sebastian Cichosz (December 6, 2016 - March 31, 2018)

Gallery

See also 
 Kompania Zamkowa
 15th Poznań Uhlans Regiment
 Guard of honour

Notes

References 

Army units and formations of Poland
Battalions of Poland
Polish ceremonial units
Military units and formations established in 2001
Military units and formations established in 2018
Military units and formations established in 1954